Tidewater may refer to:

 Tidewater (region), a geographic area of southeast Virginia, southern Maryland, and northeast North Carolina.
 Tidewater accent, an accent of American English associated with the Tidewater region of Virginia
 Tidewater glacier, a classification of glacier
 Tidewater (marine services), a company providing marine services to the offshore petroleum industry
 Tidewater Middle East Co., an Iranian port operator company that belongs to IRGC
 Tidewater (Amtrak train), a former passenger train in Virginia
 Tidewater, Oregon, a settlement
 Tidewater Petroleum, a former name of Getty Oil
 Tidewater architecture, a style of architecture found mostly in coastal areas of the Southern United States
 Tidelands, an area affected by the tide
 Tidewater, Florida, a place in Florida
 Tidewater (marketing), a term used by industries and governments
 Tidewater cypress, the bald cypress (Taxodium distichum)

See also 
 Tidelands (TV series)